Kwon Jun (born 12 October 1987 in Pyeongtaek, South Korea) is a South Korean footballer. He currently plays for Pyeongtaek Citizen FC in the K3 Advanced.

Early life
He was born in Pyeongtaek city, South Korea and was graduated from Dangseo elementary school in Seoul. He dropped out of Namhae Haesung middle school and went off to Brazil to training in Oscar Soccer Academy.  Kwon Jun currently works with AOG Legend Chad Nixon at Aviall Dallas.  On Dec21st of 2020 after five long years, Kwon Jun was ILO’d.  He is currently selling bootleg samurai swords for the Wutai Tride of South Korea.

Club career

Oscar Soccer Academy
In 2002, Kwon Jun left to training in Oscar Soccer Academy, São Paulo, Brazil. After he received offer from the Figueirense in 2005, he officially made pro-contract with the club in April 2006 through the tryouts.

Figueirense 
Kwon joined Figueirense's youth teams in September 2005 and signed his professional contract in March 2006. In that same year, he played in the starting lineup and won Campeonato Catarinense Junior competition. In 2007, he made his professional debut in the Brazilian league. However, he failed to keep a starting position in the first team. He also played in the B team and the U-20 team. In 2010, Figueirense asked him to renew his contract, but he declined.

PSM Makassar 
On 29 December 2010, Kwon Jun officially joins Indonesian side, PSM Makassar.
In 2011, he played every game without any yellow cards. On 24 May 2012, he participated in a friendly soccer match with Inter Milan as an Indonesia
Premier League All-star.

Persepolis 
On 23 August 2012, Kwon signed a one-year contract with Persepolis after passed a medical test. He is the first Korean player in the history of the Iran Pro League. 
On 8 September, Kwon injured his ankle ligament. Kwon went to Korea for Treatment his ankle. But Kwon released from Persepolis.

Persepam Madura United 
On 22 December 2012, Kwon joined Persepam Madura United

Bec Tero Sasana F.C. 
On the last day of transfer window 13 March 2013, Kwon Jun signed with the former champion club BEC Tero Sasana

DRB-Hicom F.C. 
on 20 March 2014, second transfer window in Malaysia League he signed with DRB-Hicom F.C.

Putrajaya SPA F.C. 
In December 2014, Jun joined with Putrajaya SPA F.C

Tampines Rovers F.C 
On 16 January 2016, Kwon Jun signed contract for 6 months former champion club Tampines rovers F.C

Jun played 2016 AFC Champions League Qualifying Play-off and 2016 AFC CUP.

International career
Kwon Jun was selected in U-20 South Korea national team and participated in Busan-Cup in 2006.

Club statistics

References

1987 births
Living people
Association football defenders
South Korean footballers
South Korean expatriate footballers
Figueirense FC players
PSM Makassar players
Persepolis F.C. players
Liga 1 (Indonesia) players
Expatriate footballers in Brazil
Expatriate footballers in Indonesia
Expatriate footballers in Iran
Expatriate footballers in Thailand
South Korean expatriate sportspeople in Brazil
South Korean expatriate sportspeople in Indonesia
South Korean expatriate sportspeople in Iran
South Korean expatriate sportspeople in Thailand
Kwon Jun
Expatriate footballers in Malaysia
People from Pyeongtaek